The 3rd Medical Command (Deployment Support) (MCDS) or "Desert Medics" is headquartered in Atlanta, GA and manages all the Army Reserve deployable field medical units east of Ohio. While the 807th MCDS covers the MTOE medical units to the west and ARMEDCOM provides command and control for all the Table of Distribution and Allowance (TDA) medical units within CONUS.

Units of the 3rd MCDS provide general, surgical, dental, ambulance, behavioral health, preventive maintenance, and veterinary support to Army units and to civilian populations.

Order of battle

World War II

Operation Desert Storm
3rd Medical Command 
566th Medical Company 
45th Medical Company (Air Ambulance) 
173rd Medical Group 
8th Evacuation Hospital 
663rd Medical Detachment (Surgical)
85th Evacuation Hospital 
420th Medical Detachment (Orthopedic)
201st Evacuation Hospital 
207th Evacuation Hospital
386th Medical Detachment (Neurosurgery)
47th Field Hospital 
300th Field Hospital 
120th Medical Battalion 
675th Medical Detachment (Dispensary)
1291h Medical Company (Clearing)
216th Medical Company (Ambulance) 
348th Medical Detachment (Air Ambulance)
872nd Medical Detachment (Air Ambulance)
202nd Medical Group 
129th Evacuation Hospital
311th Evacuation Hospital 
365th Evacuation Hospital
927th Medical Company
244th Medical Group 
50th General Hospital
423rd Medical Laboratory (Veterinary Services) 
996th Medical Laboratory 
316th Station Hospital
989th Medical Detachment (Surgery) 
382nd Field Hospital
467th Medical Detachment (Psychiatry)
357th Medical Detachment (Neurosurgery)
144th Evacuation Hospital 
217th Evacuation Hospital
92nd Medical Battalion 
17th Medical Detachment (General Dispensary) 
947th Medical Company (Clearing)
134th Medical Company (Ambulance)
336th Medical Detachment (Air Ambulance)
803rd Medical Group
114th Evacuation Hospital 
251st Evacuation Hospital
181st Medical Detachment (Thoracic Surgery)
395th Medical Detachment (Orthopedics)
904th Medical Detachment (Neurosurgery)
424th Medical Laboratory 
350th Evacuation Hospital 
109th Medical Battalion 
75th Medical Detachment (Dispensary Small) 
914th Medical Detachment (Dispensary Small) 
477th Medical Company (Ambulance) 
812th Medical Company (Air Ambulance)
343rd Medical Detachment (Air Ambulance) 
986th Medical Detachment (Air Ambulance)
2nd Medical Detachment (Dental Headquarters) 
122nd Medical Detachment (Dental Services)
123rd Medical Detachment (Dental Services)
379th Medical Detachment (Blood Headquarters)
448th Medical Detachment (Blood Processing)
320th Medical Detachment (Veterinary Headquarters) 
356th Medical Detachment (Veterinary Service)
422nd Medical Detachment (Veterinary Service)
483rd Medical Detachment (Veterinary Small Animal) 
888th Medical Detachment (Veterinary Small Animal)
12th Medical Detachment (Preventive Medicine)
714th Medical Detachment (Entomology)
105th Medical Detachment (Environmental Engineering)
983rd Medical Detachment (Environmental Sanitation)
US Army Medical Materiel Center, Saudi Arabia (USAMMCSWA)
47th Medical Supply, Optical, and Maintenance (MEDSOM) Battalion 
980th MEDSOM Battalion 
249th Medical Detachment (Supply Team )
49th Medical Detachment (Medical Maintenance)
153rd Medical Detachment (Inventory Control)
605th Medical Detachment (Blood Distribution)
655th Medical Detachment (Blood Storage)
145th MEDSOM Battalion 
402nd Medical Detachment (Inventory Control)
220th Medical Detachment (Medical Maintenance)

Subordinate units
3rd Medical Command (Deployment Support) is responsible for all operational reserve medical units east of the Mississippi river and in Louisiana.

  5th Medical Brigade, in Birmingham, Alabama
 810th Hospital Center, in Tuscaloosa, Alabama
 75th Field Hospital, in Tuscaloosa, Alabama
 306th Field Hospital, in Gillem Enclave, Georgia
 429th Multifunctional Medical Battalion, in Savannah, Georgia
  8th Medical Brigade, in Staten Island, New York
 865th Combat Support Hospital, in Utica, New York
 439th Multifunctional Medical Battalion, at Joint Base McGuire–Dix–Lakehurst, New Jersey
  332nd Medical Brigade, in Nashville, Tennessee
 411th Hospital Center, in Jacksonville, Florida
301st Field Hospital, in Saint Petersburg, Florida
345th Field Hospital, in Jacksonville, Florida
  338th Medical Brigade, in Horsham, Pennsylvania
 410th Hospital Center, in Fort Meade, Maryland
 18th Field Hospital, in Fort Story, Virginia
48th Combat Support Hospital, at Fort Meade, Maryland
 424th Multifunctional Medical Battalion, in Edgemont, Pennsylvania
  804th Medical Brigade, in Devens, Massachusetts
 803rd Hospital Center, in Devens, Massachusetts
399th Field Hospital, in Devens, Massachusetts
 405th Field Hospital, in West Hartford, Connecticut

Lineage
3rd Medical Command Headquarters and Headquarters Company was constituted 21 December 1928, in the Regular Army as the 3rd Auxiliary Surgical Group.

Activated 5 May 1942, at Fort Sam Houston, Texas.

Reorganized and redesignated 1 August 1945, as the 896th Medical Professional Service.

Inactivated 6 October 1945, in Germany.

Redesignated 16 March 1991, as Headquarters and Headquarters Company, 3rd Medical Command.

Activated in Saudi Arabia with personnel from Headquarters Company, 3rd Medical Command (Provisional) organized 16 September 1990 in Saudi Arabia.

The ARCENT Medical Group (Provisional) was established on 5 or 6 December 1990 by ARCENT Permanent Order 262-1 (Dinackus writes 5 December 1990).

On 29 December 1990 ARCENT Permanent Order 273-1 amended that order to create the United States Army Forces Central Command Medical Command (Provisional). It appears the order was issued on 26 March, to be made effective (implemented) on 29 December.

In order to provide the additional staff required for Headquarters, ARCENT Medical Command (Provisional), the staff of the 202nd Medical Group, an Army National Guard unit from Florida, was combined with the staff of the ARCENT Medical Group (Provisional).

On 5 March 1991, Forces Command Permanent Order 31-1 activated the 3rd Medical Command effective 15 March 1991. While not technically a re-designation, the personnel and equipment of the ARCENT Medical Command (Provisional) were 'reflagged' as the 3rd Medical Command.

Unit insignia

Shoulder sleeve insignia (SSI)

Description

Symbolism
Maroon and white are colors traditionally associated with the Medical Corps. The designation of the Command is denoted by the triangular shape of the insignia. The staff and serpents refer to medical service and the Maltese cross recalls the unit's heritage of support in combat. Yellow/gold stands for excellence.

Background
The shoulder sleeve insignia was authorized on 12 June 1992. (TIOH Drawing Number A-1-800)

Distinctive unit insignia (DUI)

Description
A gold color metal and enamel device  in height overall, consisting of a maroon cross surmounted by a white Maltese cross; on either side a gold spring of laurel conjoined at top and surmounted at top by two brown scimitars crossed diagonally points down with red tassels; at bottom an arced red scroll inscribed "FRONT LINE SURGEONS" in gold letters.

Symbolism
Maroon and white are colors traditionally associated with the Medical Corps. The maroon cross stands for Army medicine while the Maltese cross recalls the 3rd Medical Command's heritage of service and sacrifice in the field. The laurel sprigs, signifying honor and achievement, recall the unit's World War II campaigns and service. They simulate an arrowhead recalling the unit's assault landing in Sicily, while forming a triangle highlighting the unit's numerical designation. The scimitars represent the unit's participation in the two Southwest Asia Campaigns. Gold stands for excellence, red for courage and sacrifice.

Background
The distinctive unit insignia was authorized on 27 July 1992

Unit honors

World War II
Tunisia
Sicily (with Arrowhead)
Normandy (with Arrowhead)
Northern France
Ardennes-Alcase
Rhineland
Central Europe

Southwest Asia
Liberation and Defense of Kuwait 
Southwest Asia Cease-Fire
Defense of Saudi Arabia 2 August 1990-16 January 1991

Global War on Terrorism
Operation Enduring Freedom (OEF)
Iraqi Freedom (OIF)

Iraq
National Resolution
Iraqi Surge
Iraqi Sovereignty

Unit awards 
Meritorious Unit Commendation:
 EUROPEAN THEATER 1944
 SOUTHWEST ASIA 1990–1991
 SOUTHWEST ASIA 2009–2010
 SOUTHWEST ASIA 2012–2013 (Detachment)

References

External links
 GlobalSecurity.org, 3rd Medical Command, miscellaneous details

003
003
Military units and formations established in 1942